Microphysogobio brevirostris is a species of cyprinid fish endemic to Taiwan.

References

Microphysogobio
Fish described in 1868
Taxa named by Albert Günther